The Braille pattern dots-456 is a 6-dot braille cell with all three right dots raised, or an 8-dot braille cell with the top, upper-middle, and lower-middle right dots raised. It is represented by the Unicode code point U+2838, and in Braille ASCII with the underscore: _.

Unified Braille

In unified international braille, the braille pattern dots-456 is used to represent lateral approximant, such as /l/, /ʟ/, or /ʎ/ when multiple letters correspond to these values, and is otherwise assigned as needed.

Table of unified braille values

Other braille

Plus dots 7 and 8

Related to Braille pattern dots-456 are Braille patterns 4567, 4568, and 45678, which are used in 8-dot braille systems, such as Gardner-Salinas and Luxembourgish Braille.

Related 8-dot kantenji patterns

In the Japanese kantenji braille, the standard 8-dot Braille patterns 568, 1568, 4568, and 14568 are the patterns related to Braille pattern dots-456, since the two additional dots of kantenji patterns 0456, 4567, and 04567 are placed above the base 6-dot cell, instead of below, as in standard 8-dot braille.

Kantenji using braille patterns 568, 1568, 4568, or 14568

This listing includes kantenji using Braille pattern dots-456 for all 6349 kanji found in JIS C 6226-1978.

  - 氷

Variants and thematic compounds

  -  selector 4 + 氷/氵  =  改
  -  selector 4 + selector 4 + 氷/氵  =  攵
  -  selector 6 + 氷/氵  =  曷
  -  氷/氵 + selector 1  =  冷
  -  氷/氵 + selector 2  =  汰
  -  氷/氵 + selector 3  =  冫
  -  氷/氵 + selector 4  =  永

Compounds of 氷 and 氵

  -  ま/石 + 氷/氵  =  承
  -  ふ/女 + 氷/氵  =  汝
  -  た/⽥ + 氷/氵  =  油
  -  日 + 氷/氵  =  泉
  -  い/糹/#2 + 氷/氵  =  線
  -  き/木 + 日 + 氷/氵  =  楾
  -  に/氵 + 日 + 氷/氵  =  湶
  -  ⺼ + 日 + 氷/氵  =  腺
  -  せ/食 + 氷/氵  =  漁
  -  に/氵 + 氷/氵  =  激
  -  火 + 氷/氵  =  烝
  -  そ/馬 + 氷/氵  =  牧
  -  め/目 + 氷/氵  =  瞥
  -  ⺼ + 氷/氵  =  膝
  -  く/艹 + 氷/氵  =  藩
  -  氷/氵 + き/木  =  染
  -  氷/氵 + か/金  =  汗
  -  氷/氵 + も/門  =  汚
  -  氷/氵 + こ/子  =  江
  -  氷/氵 + 龸  =  沈
  -  氷/氵 + ほ/方  =  沙
  -  ふ/女 + 氷/氵 + ほ/方  =  娑
  -  心 + 氷/氵 + ほ/方  =  莎
  -  ね/示 + 氷/氵 + ほ/方  =  裟
  -  せ/食 + 氷/氵 + ほ/方  =  鯊
  -  氷/氵 + め/目  =  沸
  -  氷/氵 + な/亻  =  治
  -  氷/氵 + 宿  =  況
  -  氷/氵 + 氷/氵 + 宿  =  况
  -  氷/氵 + 日  =  泊
  -  ち/竹 + 氷/氵 + 日  =  箔
  -  氷/氵 + 心  =  泌
  -  氷/氵 + ふ/女  =  津
  -  氷/氵 + み/耳  =  派
  -  氷/氵 + そ/馬  =  浄
  -  氷/氵 + 氷/氵 + そ/馬  =  淨
  -  氷/氵 + う/宀/#3  =  浮
  -  氷/氵 + た/⽥  =  浴
  -  氷/氵 + ゑ/訁  =  浸
  -  氷/氵 + つ/土  =  涯
  -  氷/氵 + れ/口  =  涼
  -  氷/氵 + 氷/氵 + れ/口  =  凉
  -  氷/氵 + に/氵  =  淫
  -  ち/竹 + 氷/氵 + に/氵  =  霪
  -  氷/氵 + 囗  =  淳
  -  氷/氵 + る/忄  =  添
  -  氷/氵 + せ/食  =  清
  -  氷/氵 + さ/阝  =  済
  -  氷/氵 + 氷/氵 + さ/阝  =  濟
  -  氷/氵 + ぬ/力  =  測
  -  氷/氵 + よ/广  =  源
  -  氷/氵 + ろ/十  =  準
  -  氷/氵 + 氷/氵 + ろ/十  =  凖
  -  氷/氵 + り/分  =  溢
  -  氷/氵 + ら/月  =  滑
  -  氷/氵 + ち/竹  =  漏
  -  氷/氵 + え/訁  =  演
  -  氷/氵 + く/艹  =  漢
  -  氷/氵 + ま/石  =  漫
  -  氷/氵 + お/頁  =  漬
  -  氷/氵 + ゐ/幺  =  潔
  -  氷/氵 + け/犬  =  潜
  -  氷/氵 + 氷/氵 + け/犬  =  潛
  -  selector 1 + 氷/氵 + け/犬  =  濳
  -  氷/氵 + 火  =  潟
  -  氷/氵 + へ/⺩  =  潤
  -  氷/氵 + む/車  =  濁
  -  氷/氵 + の/禾  =  濡
  -  氷/氵 + ⺼  =  濫
  -  氷/氵 + 数  =  瀬
  -  氷/氵 + 宿 + つ/土  =  汢
  -  氷/氵 + 宿 + 日  =  汨
  -  氷/氵 + 宿 + ろ/十  =  浤
  -  氷/氵 + 宿 + か/金  =  淦
  -  氷/氵 + 龸 + selector 2  =  滉
  -  氷/氵 + 宿 + ぬ/力  =  滔
  -  氷/氵 + 宿 + 仁/亻  =  漑
  -  氷/氵 + 龸 + そ/馬  =  漾
  -  氷/氵 + 宿 + け/犬  =  潅
  -  に/氵 + ら/月 + 氷/氵  =  潸
  -  氷/氵 + ら/月 + た/⽥  =  澑
  -  氷/氵 + 宿 + く/艹  =  濛
  -  氷/氵 + へ/⺩ + し/巿  =  濤
  -  氷/氵 + と/戸 + 日  =  瀦
  -  氷/氵 + 囗 + め/目  =  瀰
  -  氷/氵 + 龸 + け/犬  =  灌

Compounds of 改 and 攵

  -  み/耳 + 氷/氵  =  敢
  -  よ/广 + 氷/氵  =  厳
  -  な/亻 + よ/广 + 氷/氵  =  儼
  -  や/疒 + 氷/氵  =  巌
  -  や/疒 + や/疒 + 氷/氵  =  巖
  -  心 + み/耳 + 氷/氵  =  橄
  -  め/目 + み/耳 + 氷/氵  =  瞰
  -  ゆ/彳 + 氷/氵  =  微
  -  心 + ゆ/彳 + 氷/氵  =  薇
  -  仁/亻 + 氷/氵  =  攸
  -  こ/子 + 氷/氵  =  攻
  -  ほ/方 + 氷/氵  =  放
  -  ん/止 + 氷/氵  =  政
  -  れ/口 + 氷/氵  =  故
  -  な/亻 + れ/口 + 氷/氵  =  做
  -  龸 + 氷/氵  =  敏
  -  ろ/十 + 氷/氵  =  救
  -  を/貝 + 氷/氵  =  敗
  -  と/戸 + 氷/氵  =  教
  -  ら/月 + 氷/氵  =  散
  -  て/扌 + ら/月 + 氷/氵  =  撒
  -  い/糹/#2 + ら/月 + 氷/氵  =  繖
  -  も/門 + 氷/氵  =  敬
  -  き/木 + も/門 + 氷/氵  =  檠
  -  お/頁 + 氷/氵  =  敵
  -  む/車 + 氷/氵  =  敷
  -  り/分 + 氷/氵  =  斂
  -  に/氵 + り/分 + 氷/氵  =  瀲
  -  き/木 + 氷/氵  =  枚
  -  か/金 + 氷/氵  =  赦
  -  む/車 + か/金 + 氷/氵  =  螫
  -  ひ/辶 + 氷/氵  =  邀
  -  ち/竹 + 氷/氵  =  霰
  -  氷/氵 + し/巿  =  幣
  -  氷/氵 + 氷/氵 + し/巿  =  幤
  -  氷/氵 + と/戸  =  弊
  -  氷/氵 + ゆ/彳  =  致
  -  い/糹/#2 + 氷/氵 + ゆ/彳  =  緻
  -  氷/氵 + す/発  =  覆
  -  仁/亻 + 宿 + 氷/氵  =  傚
  -  よ/广 + 宿 + 氷/氵  =  厰
  -  こ/子 + 龸 + 氷/氵  =  孜
  -  ゆ/彳 + 宿 + 氷/氵  =  徼
  -  も/門 + 宿 + 氷/氵  =  攷
  -  氷/氵 + selector 3 + は/辶  =  敝
  -  氷/氵 + selector 6 + は/辶  =  敞
  -  こ/子 + 宿 + 氷/氵  =  敦
  -  氷/氵 + ほ/方 + selector 2  =  斃
  -  日 + 宿 + 氷/氵  =  暾
  -  き/木 + 宿 + 氷/氵  =  檄
  -  火 + 宿 + 氷/氵  =  燉
  -  た/⽥ + 宿 + 氷/氵  =  畋
  -  氷/氵 + う/宀/#3 + り/分  =  竅
  -  く/艹 + 宿 + 氷/氵  =  蔽
  -  に/氵 + 宿 + 氷/氵  =  覈
  -  か/金 + 宿 + 氷/氵  =  鐓
  -  氷/氵 + 比 + め/目  =  鼈

Compounds of 曷

  -  て/扌 + 氷/氵  =  掲
  -  氷/氵 + 氷/氵  =  渇
  -  ね/示 + 氷/氵  =  褐
  -  え/訁 + 氷/氵  =  謁
  -  く/艹 + え/訁 + 氷/氵  =  藹
  -  な/亻 + 宿 + 氷/氵  =  偈
  -  れ/口 + 宿 + 氷/氵  =  喝
  -  氷/氵 + ん/止 + selector 1  =  歇
  -  ま/石 + 宿 + 氷/氵  =  碣
  -  ま/石 + 龸 + 氷/氵  =  竭
  -  そ/馬 + 宿 + 氷/氵  =  羯
  -  心 + 宿 + 氷/氵  =  葛
  -  む/車 + 宿 + 氷/氵  =  蝎
  -  ひ/辶 + 宿 + 氷/氵  =  遏
  -  ち/竹 + 宿 + 氷/氵  =  靄
  -  と/戸 + 宿 + 氷/氵  =  鞨

Compounds of 冫

  -  さ/阝 + 氷/氵  =  凄
  -  う/宀/#3 + 氷/氵  =  寒
  -  氷/氵 + 仁/亻  =  冶
  -  氷/氵 + い/糹/#2  =  准
  -  も/門 + 氷/氵 + い/糹/#2  =  匯
  -  氷/氵 + や/疒  =  凝
  -  氷/氵 + ん/止  =  次
  -  氷/氵 + を/貝  =  資
  -  れ/口 + 氷/氵 + ん/止  =  咨
  -  る/忄 + 氷/氵 + ん/止  =  恣
  -  か/金 + 氷/氵 + ん/止  =  瓷
  -  の/禾 + 氷/氵 + ん/止  =  粢
  -  氷/氵 + ひ/辶  =  凍
  -  氷/氵 + 宿 + に/氵  =  冰
  -  氷/氵 + 比 + ⺼  =  冱
  -  氷/氵 + 宿 + め/目  =  冴
  -  氷/氵 + ほ/方 + ぬ/力  =  冽
  -  氷/氵 + 囗 + ろ/十  =  凅
  -  氷/氵 + 囗 + つ/土  =  凋
  -  氷/氵 + 宿 + す/発  =  凌
  -  氷/氵 + 宿 + れ/口  =  凛
  -  氷/氵 + う/宀/#3 + そ/馬  =  馮

Compounds of 永

  -  れ/口 + 氷/氵 + selector 4  =  咏
  -  る/忄 + 氷/氵 + selector 4  =  怺
  -  日 + 氷/氵 + selector 4  =  昶
  -  ⺼ + 氷/氵 + selector 4  =  脉

Other compounds

  -  心 + 氷/氵  =  茜
  -  ふ/女 + 氷/氵 + う/宀/#3  =  艀
  -  む/車 + 氷/氵 + う/宀/#3  =  蜉
  -  さ/阝 + 氷/氵 + う/宀/#3  =  郛
  -  せ/食 + 氷/氵 + 龸  =  酖
  -  氷/氵 + 日 + ろ/十  =  覃
  -  氷/氵 + 宿 + せ/食  =  鴆

Notes

Braille patterns